Compiègne is a commune in the Oise department in northern France. It is located on the river Oise. Its inhabitants are called Compiégnois.

Administration
Compiègne is the seat of two cantons:
 Compiègne-1 (with 19 communes and part of Compiègne)
 Compiègne-2 (with 16 communes and part of Compiègne)

History by year
 665 - Saint Wilfrid was consecrated Bishop of York. Wilfrid refused to be consecrated in Northumbria at the hands of Anglo-Saxon bishops. Deusdedit, Archbishop of Canterbury, had died, and as there were no other bishops in Britain whom Wilfrid considered to have been validly consecrated, he travelled to Compiègne, to be consecrated by Agilbert, the Bishop of Paris.

 833 -  Louis the Pious (also known as King Louis I, the Debonair) was deposed in Compiègne.

 February 888 - Odo, Count of Paris and king of the Franks was crowned in Compiègne.

 23 May 1430 - During the Hundred Years' War, Joan of Arc was captured by the Burgundians while attempting to free Compiègne. They then sold her to the English.

 1557 - Bataille de Saint Quentin

 1558 - Les Anglais occupe Compiegne

 1624 - Compiègne gave its name to the Treaty of Compiègne, a treaty of alliance concluded by Cardinal Richelieu with the Dutch.

 1630 - Marie de' Medici's attempts to displace Richelieu ultimately led to her exile to Compiègne, from where she escaped to Brussels in 1631.

 17 July 1794 - The Martyrs of Compiègne are executed in Paris during the Reign of Terror.

 1900 - The golf events for the 1900 Summer Olympics took place.

 11 November 1918 - The Armistice with Germany (Compiègne), agreed at Le Francport near Compiègne, ends fighting of World War I

 22 June 1940 - Another Armistice with France (Second Compiègne) was signed between Nazi Germany and the defeated France in Le Francport, near Compiègne, in the same place as in 1918, in the same railroad carriage, but with the seats swapped.

 1941 - During the German occupation of France, the Compiègne internment camp was established in Compiègne. A memorial of the camp, and another along the railway tracks, commemorate the tragedy.

 1968 - The starting location of the Paris–Roubaix bicycle race was changed from Paris to Compiègne.

 1972 - Creation of the University of Technology of Compiègne

Population

Compiègne is the central commune of an urban unit with 70,699 inhabitants, and a larger commuter zone with 141,504 inhabitants as of 2017. The population data in the table and graph below refer to the commune of Compiègne proper.

Sights

Museums
 Château de Compiègne - the castle itself, and museums of the Second French Empire and of motoring and tourism within its walls
 Musée Antoine Vivenel
 Museum of historic figurines
 Memorial of internment and deportation

Compiègne Forest

The Glade of the Armistice in the Compiègne Forest was the site of the signing of two armistices; those of 11 November 1918 and 22 June 1940. Hitler specifically chose the location of the second, and had the original signing carriage moved from Paris to Compiègne, as an irony for the defeated French.

The site still houses several memorials to the 1918 armistice, including a copy of the original railway carriage. The original, Marshal Foch's Carriage was taken to Germany as a trophy of victory following the second armistice. Various rumors about what happened to this railway-carriage thereafter, have flourished ever since. Some believe it was destroyed by the SS in Thuringia in April 1945; others say this happened in Berlin, but most likely was it destroyed during an allied air-raid on Berlin. The latter version seems most plausible, since Ferdinand Foch's carriage actually was displayed at a Berlin museum.

The University of Technology of Compiègne 

Compiègne is home to the University of Technology of Compiègne (UTC), one of the top ranking engineering school in France, founded as a Technology University in 1972 to provide an alternative to the traditional "grandes écoles" for students interested in technologies and applied science.

Transport
Compiègne station offers connections with Paris, Amiens, Cambrai and several regional destinations. The nearest motorway is the A1 Paris-Lille.

Cycling
Since 1968 Compiègne is the traditional start city of the famous Paris–Roubaix bicycle race. It was also the finish city of 3rd stage in the 2007 Tour de France.

Notable people
Compiègne has been home to:
 Roscellinus (~1050 - ~1122), philosopher and theologian, often regarded as the founder of Nominalism
 Pierre d'Ailly (1350–1420), theologian and cardinal of the Roman Catholic Church
 Albert Robida (1848–1926), illustrator, etcher, lithographer, caricaturist, and novelist
 Eugène Albertini (1880–1941), teacher in Latin literature, historian of ancient Rome, and epigrapher of Latin texts 
 Marcel Tabuteau (1887–1966), Oboist, regarded as the founder of American oboe playing.
 Suzanne Lenglen (1899–1938), tennis player, international female sport star
 Lucas Debargue (1990–), pianist and composer who worked in both the classical and jazz fields.
 The Martyrs of Compiègne

International relations

Compiègne is twinned with:

Compiègne is also partnered with:

See also
 Communes of the Oise department
 Dialogues of the Carmelites
 Martyrs of Compiegne
 Monument aux morts (Oise)
 Siege of Compiègne
 Timeline of deportations of French Jews to death camps

References

External links

 City council website (in French)
 Le musée du château/The Château museum
 Memorial to Nazi/French Internment Camp and Deportations During WW2
  Steven Lehrer's Compiègne site
 Universite de Technologie de Compiegne
Joan of Arc Captured At Compiegne
 customized transport in compiègne
 Concerts in Compiègne

 
Venues of the 1900 Summer Olympics
Communes of Oise
Subprefectures in France
World Heritage Sites in France